Tower of Evil, also known by the titles Horror on Snape Island and Beyond the Fog, is a 1972 British horror film directed by Jim O'Connolly.

Plot

The movie opens with a boat cruising through heavy fog, on a spooky night. The boat lands on a rocky island (Snape) and two older seamen go on shore. Soon they find a severed hand with a crab on it. After they see the male body it was attached to, they decide to go into the lighthouse to investigate. They find a female body with a severed head. They split up and find another murdered body. Then they find a live, young woman, Penny, hiding in a closet. Traumatized to an extreme, she stabs the older of the men who finds her to death. The other man (the captain) of the boat survives.

Next, she is being examined by doctors who talk about her state of shock and how she and her friends made it to Snape Island. After running tests they try to find out more of what happened. Penny starts to talk and remember how her friends arrived. She starts to scream as the flashbacks disturb her.

After hearing about this, a group of scientists decide to visit the Island. They know that the Island is loaded with gold and Phoenician treasures. A team of 5 men and 2 women sets out on the Sea Ghost, which is captained by the seaman who survived the opening scene.

They land and immediately start to see strange things, like a lack of sea gulls, other forms of life, and a mystery. No one believes that Penny killed anyone but the old man. They suspect that the island has another inhabitant. As the men empty the boat, the women argue over the men. Jealousy and love triangles are apparent.  Their leader, Dr. Simpson, breaks away to look at a stashed away sack. The captain sees a picture of his brother in the mansion. He explains to the others that his brother, sister-in-law and their child all died on this God forsaken island. Then the movie cuts back to the mainland where the doctor is hypnotizing Penny. She is seeing the past. The murder of her friends by a large, laughing, bearded psycho. The disturbing scenes show what really happened to her 3 friends. Penny comes to and screams violently.

Back on the island, the team is discussing the island's history when they hear a strange noise. They split up to look for the cause. Two of the team bump into each other. Though the woman is terrified she learns that some of the team members have been to the island before and are keeping that quiet. Afterward they are all shown together. Dr. Simpson decides to check on the boat, or so he says. Before he goes, he says that the 3 young people must have been murdered by a madman, and he believes the madman is still on the island. While two people go upstairs to have intercourse, the rest of the men go out to look for the Doctor. They find that someone has blown up the boat. The young man having sex with the lovely Nora runs down to the boat. Nora, alone, wanders and is stalked by the murderer. She sees a decomposing body in a rocker. She screams and passes out.

The others come running and find Nora and the body.  They demand answers from the captain. He admits that he has been lying and keeping secrets. He tells of how his sister-in-law, the corpse, died and how his brother Saul is still there, living in the caves under the house. The madman has also destroyed their radio. The men decide to go in pairs to find Saul. The women stay inside and talk about the story they have just heard. The captain and his search partner find Saul's cave.

Nora's friend Rose hears a man weeping. She investigates, and looking through a wall, she sees Saul, rocking the corpse of his dead wife. He hears her and stalks her. He finds Nora, who runs to the top of the lighthouse where Saul throws her off onto the rocks below. Seeing that she is dead, Rose and the 2 other men go into a cave together. Meanwhile, the Doctor, who is near a coffin, finds the treasure. He hears the strange sound again, like a flute, and pursues it. After he leaves, the captain's search partner finds the treasure. As soon as he looks it over, he hears Saul laugh, and then Saul crashes in on him. Shortly after, the remaining 5 meet up in the cave. The Doctor explains that he fired his gun at Saul and has been stalking him all night.

Then the creepy flute music starts. Rose and Dan, one of the men, stay with the treasure while the captain, the Doctor and the other man go looking for Saul. Rose is looking at a gold lantern when Saul attacks from out of nowhere. Dan comes to help, but the large Saul breaks his neck. With all of the screaming the 3 men reappear and shoot Saul dead. The Doctor reveals that he has been to the island before and left a boat and supplies on the other side of the island. The captain stays with Rose and the 2 other men go to get the boat and some of the artifacts. Then Rose and the captain go inside and talk about Saul and his diseased family. The captain says that Martha never wanted his brother Saul to be reported. The captain encourages Rose to get some sleep. She decides to wait up and he goes upstairs. Then the captain comes back down bleeding to death. He says the name Michael, Saul's son, and dies. Then the deformed son of Saul, Michael attacks Rose. She throws an oil lamp at him and sets him on fire. As he burns to death the whole house and cave catch on fire as Saul had it rigged to. Rose narrowly escapes and the 2 surviving men get out of the cave to watch the house and its mad dwellers burn to ashes.

Cast
Bryant Haliday as Evan Brent
Jill Haworth as Rose Mason
Anna Palk as Nora Winthrop
William Lucas as Superintendent Hawk
Anthony Valentine as Dr. Simpson
Jack Watson as Hamp Gurney
Mark Edwards as Adam
Derek Fowlds as Dan Winthrop
John Hamill as Gary
Gary Hamilton as Brom
Candace Glendenning as Penny Read
Seretta Wilson as Mae
Dennis Price as Laurence Bakewell
George Coulouris as John Gurney
Robin Askwith as Des
Frederic Abbott as Saul Gurney
Mark McBride as Michael Gurney
Marianne Stone as Nurse

Production

Development
Producer Richard Gordon was looking for a horror film he could make in England in association with Joe Solomon of Fanfare Films. Gordon met Geogre Baxt who pitched him the story of Tower of Evil and Gordon bought it. Gordon paid Baxt $5,000 to write a script which was delivered six months later. Neither Gordon nor Solomon liked the final script, feeling that there was too much humor.

Gordon decided to proceed on the  basis of the strength of the story, looking for a new director. He approached Sidney Hayers who was a friend of Baxt, but Gordon turned him down because he felt Hayers was too enthusiastic about Baxt's script and wanted to shoot it as written. Gordon was then introduced by Herman Cohen to Jim O'Connolly (the two men had made Berserk! together), who said he would only make it if the script was rewritten; Gordon agreed, and O'Connolly rewrote the script to a degree which pleased Gordon and Solomon. Gordon says this permanently ruined his relationship with Baxt.

Casting
Gordon says the British unions protested the importation of American actor Bryant Haliday to play a role. Gordon arranged for Lee Patterson has a back up but secured Halliday's casting by claiming that the film's financing was dependent on Haliday being in the cast.

Gordon says Mark Edwards was recommended to him by James Carreras off the back of Blood from the Mummy's Tomb.

Filming
Apart from a few location shots, the movie was entirely filmed at Shepperton Studios in Shepperton, Surrey in 1971.

Release
The film was released in America as Horror on Snape Island.

Box Office
Gordon says the film did "very well" in England.

Critical reaction

The film was dismissed as mere exploitation fodder by many critics. Film critic Leonard Maltin gave the film a BOMB rating and mockingly said "One of the Horrors of Snape Island is the film itself".

However, over the years, the film has been embraced as something of an underground classic by the horror community. The Terror Trap horror review rated the film positively, calling it "A surprisingly adroit little British slasher, Tower of Evil is a revelatory sleeper.". Elite Entertainment released Tower of Evil on DVD for the first time in 1999. On 12 December 2008, Turner Classic Movies showed the film as part of their late night TCM Underground series.

References

External links
 

1972 films
1972 horror films
1970s slasher films
British horror films
British serial killer films
British slasher films
EMI Films films
Films directed by Jim O'Connolly
Films set on fictional islands
Films shot at Shepperton Studios
Works set in lighthouses
1970s English-language films
1970s British films